Hamigera may refer to:
 Hamigera (sponge), a genus of sponges in the family Hymedesmiidae
 Hamigera (fungus), a genus of funguses in the family Aspergillaceae